The North Nova Scotia Highlanders was an infantry regiment of the Canadian Army founded in 1936. In 1954, it was amalgamated with The Pictou Highlanders and 189 LAA RCA Battery to form 1st Battalion, The Nova Scotia Highlanders (North).

History 
Founded in 1936 as The North Nova Scotia Highlanders (M.G.) by the amalgamation of The Cumberland Highlanders, The Colchester and Hants Regiment, and 'C' Company, 6th Machine-Gun Battalion, it acquired its present title in 1941. The regiment landed on Juno beach on D-Day, assigned to 9th Canadian Infantry Brigade, 3rd Canadian Infantry Division. In 1954, as a result of the Kennedy Report on the Reserve Army, this regiment was amalgamated The Pictou Highlanders and 189 LAA RCA Battery to form 1st Battalion, The Nova Scotia Highlanders (North).

The North Nova Scotia Highlanders before Amalgamation held its final Order of Precedence as 34.

Lineage

The North Nova Scotia Highlanders 

 Originated in Amherst, Nova Scotia, 6 April 1871 as the Cumberland Provisional Battalion of Infantry.
 Redesignated as the 93rd Cumberland Battalion of Infantry, 12 June 1885.
 Redesignated as the 93rd Cumberland Regiment, on 8 May 1900.
 Redesignated as The Cumberland Regiment, 29 March 1920.
 Redesignated as The Cumberland Highlanders, 15 June 1927.
 Amalgamated on 1 December 1936 with The Colchester and Hants Regiment (less 'C Company') and C Company of the 6th Machine Gun Battalion, CMGC (now The Princess Louise Fusiliers) and redesignated as The North Nova Scotia Highlanders (Machine Gun).
 Redesignated as the 2nd (Reserve) Battalion, The North Nova Scotia Highlanders (Machine Gun), 7 November 1940.
 Redesignated as the 2nd (Reserve) Battalion, The North Nova Scotia Highlanders, 7 March 1941.
 Redesignated as The North Nova Scotia Highlanders, 1 May 1946.
 Amalgamated on 12 November 1954 with The Pictou Highlanders (Motor) and the 189th Light Anti-Aircraft Battery, RCA as the 1st Battalion, The Nova Scotia Highlanders (North).

The Colchester and Hants Regiment 

 Originated on 1 April 1910, in Truro, Nova Scotia as the 70th Colchester and Hants Regiment .
 Redesignated on 2 May 1910, as the 76th Colchester and Hants Rifles.
 Amalgamated on 1 April 1920, with the 81st Hants Regiment and Redesignated as The Colchester and Hants Regiment.
 Amalgamated on 1 December 1936, with The Cumberland Highlanders and “C” Company of the 6th Machine Gun Battalion, CMGC to form The North Nova Scotia Highlanders (Machine Gun).

The 81st Hants Regiment 

 Originated on 16 February 1914, in Windsor, Nova Scotia, as a Regiment of Infantry in Hants County.
 Redesignated on 1 May 1914, as the 68th Regiment.
 Redesignated again on 1 June 1914, as the 81st Hants Regiment.
 Amalgamated on 15 May 1920, with the 76th Colchester and Hants Rifles and Redesignated as The Colchester and Hants Regiment.

Perpetuations 
The regiment perpetuated the following units:

Great War 

 25th Battalion (Nova Scotia Rifles), CEF
 106th Battalion (Nova Scotia Rifles), CEF
 193rd Battalion (Nova Scotia Highlanders), CEF

Alliances and uniform 
The North Nova Scotia Highlanders were allied to the South Staffordshire Regiment and were kitted with a blue glengarry with diced border, scarlet doublet, white sporran with five black points, scarlet & green hose, green garter flashes with full dress only for pipers and drummers.

Battle honours 
Only uppercase honours are displayed on the guidon.
War of 1812
DEFENCE OF CANADA – 1812–1815 (honorary distinction)
Boer War
SOUTH AFRICA 1899–1900
First World War

MONT SORREL
Flers-Courcelette
Arras 1917 & 1918
Vimy 1917
Hill 70
Passchendaele

AMIENS
Cambrai 1918
Arleux
YPRES 1917 & 1918
Somme 1916 & 1918
Thiepval

Ancre Heights
Scarpe 1917 & 1918
HINDENBURG LINE
Canal du Nord
PURSUIT TO MONSs
FRANCE AND FLANDERS, 1915–18

Second World War

NORMANDY LANDING
Authie
CAEN
The Orne
BOURGUÉBUS RIDGE
Faubourg de Vaucelles
Verrières Ridge- Tilly-la-Campagne
FALAISE

The Laison
Battle of Chambois
Boulogne, 1944
Calais, 1944 liberation
THE SCHELDT
Savojaards Plaat
Breskens Pocket
THE RHINELAND

Waal Flats
The Hochwald
THE RHINE
Zutphen
Leer
NORTH-WEST EUROPE, 1944–1945

Ardenne Abbey Massacre 

During the Second World War, Major General Kurt Meyer of the Waffen SS murdered captured soldiers from the regiment.
After the war he was tried and convicted in Canada. Sentenced to death on 28 December 1945, his sentence was commuted to life imprisonment on 14 January 1946. After serving nearly nine years in prison, Meyer was released on 7 September 1954.

See also 

 Canadian-Scottish regiment

References

Bibliography 
 Barnes, RM, The Uniforms and History of the Scottish Regiments, London, Sphere Books Limited, 1972.
 Brode, Patrick. "Casual Slaughters and Accidental Judgments: Canadian War Crimes Prosecutions, 1944-1948." Toronto: The Osgoode Society for Canadian Legal History, 1997.
Campbell, Ian. "Murder at the Abbaye: The Story of Twenty Canadian Soldiers Murdered at the Abbaye d’Ardenne."  Ottawa: The Golden Dog Press, 1996.
 Volume 3, Part 2: Infantry Regiments – THE NOVA SCOTIA HIGHLANDERS

Further reading 
 Will R. Bird. "No retreating footsteps: the story of the North Novas." Kentville, NS: Kentville Publishing Company, 1946
 Pearce, Donald. "Journal of a War: North-West Europe, 1944–1945." Toronto: Macmillan, 1965.

External links 
 www.regiments.org – The North Nova Scotia Highlanders
 Juno Beach – 9th Brigade on D-Day

North Nova Scotia Highlanders
Nova Scotia Highlanders
Highland & Scottish regiments of Canada
Military units and formations of Nova Scotia
Infantry regiments of Canada in World War II
Military units and formations established in 1936
Amherst, Nova Scotia
Military units and formations disestablished in 1954
Military regiments raised in Nova Scotia